Zhukov is a town and the administrative center of Zhukovsky District in Kaluga Oblast, Russia, located on the Ugodka River (Protva's tributary)  northwest of Kaluga, the administrative center of the oblast. Population:

History
It was founded in the early 17th century. It has been known as a settlement of Ugodsky Zavod since 1656 due to the construction of an ironworks. In 1974, it was renamed Zhukovo in honor of Georgy Zhukov, the most decorated general in Russian and Soviet military history, who was born there. In 1996, Zhukovo merged with neighboring Protva, was granted town status, and renamed Zhukov.

Geography

Administrative and municipal status
Within the framework of administrative divisions, Zhukov serves as the administrative center of Zhukovsky District, to which it is directly subordinated. As a municipal division, the town of Zhukov is incorporated within Zhukovsky Municipal District as Zhukov Urban Settlement.

Gallery

References

Notes

Sources

External links

Official website of Zhukov 
Zhukov Business Directory 
Zhukov on heraldicum.ru  

Cities and towns in Kaluga Oblast
Maloyaroslavetsky Uyezd